Annie Russell Wall  (July 18, 1835 - May 8, 1920) was an American historian, writer, and teacher.

Biography
Annie Russell Wall was born in New Bedford, Massachusetts, July 18n 1835. Her parents were William A. Wall, a New Bedford artist of note, and Rhobe T. (Russell) Wall, descended from John Russell who settled in Dartmouth, Massachusetts, in the 17th century.

After passing her early life in New Bedord, Wall went to Cambridge, Massachusetts to teach and later to Washington University in St. Louis , Missouri. She was associated with John Fiske.

After her return to New Bedford, circa 1900, Wall became corresponding secretary of The Alliance of the First Congregational Society, an office which she filled until her death. She was a Life Member of the Alliance of Unitarian and Other Liberal Christian Women.

A lifelong student of history, general and ecclesiastical, Wall gave each year in the Unitarian Chapel in New Bedford courses of Bible lectures.

Annie Russell Wall died in New Bedford, May 8, 1920.

Selected works
 Outlines of English History, 1880 (Text)
 Sordello's Story Retold in Prose, 1886 (Text)
 Poems, 1944 (Text)

Articles
 "Gosnold and His Colony at Cuttyhunk", 1903 (Text)
 "The Origin and Development of the Christian Sunday"
 "French Art in Relation to the Monarchy"
 "The Supernatural in Shakespeare"
 "Is Shakespeare's Caesar Ignoble?"
 "Dante's Imperialism"
 "The Authorship of 'De Tribus'."

References

External links
 

1835 births
1920 deaths
19th-century American writers
20th-century American writers
19th-century American women writers
20th-century American women writers
Washington University in St. Louis faculty
People from New Bedford, Massachusetts
Writers from Massachusetts